Favorinus  is a genus of small sea slugs, aeolid nudibranchs, marine gastropod mollusks in the family Facelinidae.

Species
Species within the genus Favorinus  include:
  Favorinus auritulus Er. Marcus, 1955
  Favorinus blianus Lemche & Thompson, 1974
  Favorinus branchialis (Rathke, 1806)
  Favorinus elenalexiae Garcia F. & Troncoso, 2001
  Favorinus ghanensis Edmunds, 1968
 Favorinus japonicus Baba, 1949
 Favorinus mirabilis Baba, 1955
 Favorinus pacificus Baba, 1937
  Favorinus pannuceus Burn, 1962
 Favorinus perfoliatus Baba, 1949
  Favorinus tsuruganus Baba & Abe, 1964
  Favorinus vitreus Ortea, 1982
Species brought into synonymy
 Favorinus albidus Iredale & O'Donoghue, 1923: synonym of Favorinus branchialis (Rathke, 1806) (synonym)
 Favorinus albus Odhner, 1914: synonym of Dicata odhneri Schmekel, 1967 (dubious synonym)
 Favorinus albus (Alder & Hancock, 1844): synonym of Favorinus branchialis (Rathke, 1806)
 Favorinus horridus Macnae, 1954: synonym of Phyllodesmium horridum (Macnae, 1954)

References

Further reading
 Vaught, K.C. (1989). A classification of the living Mollusca. American Malacologists: Melbourne, FL (USA). . XII, 195 pp.
 Gofas, S.; Le Renard, J.; Bouchet, P. (2001). Mollusca, in: Costello, M.J. et al. (Ed.) (2001). European register of marine species: a check-list of the marine species in Europe and a bibliography of guides to their identification. Collection Patrimoines Naturels, 50: pp. 180–213
 Rolán E., 2005. Malacological Fauna From The Cape Verde Archipelago. Part 1, Polyplacophora and Gastropoda.

External links
 Gray, J.E. (1850). Explanation of plates and list of genera. In: M.E. Gray, Figures of molluscous animals, selected from various authors. Vol. 4. Longman, Brown, Green and Longmans, London, 124 pp
 Mörch, O.A.L. (1871) Synopsis molluscorum marinorum Daniae, Fortegnelse over de i de Danske Have forekommende Blöddyr. Videnskabelige Meddelelser fra den Naturhistoriske Forening i Kjöbenhavn, 1871(11–14), 157–225
 http://www.molluscs.otago.ac.nz/ Spencer H.G., Willan R.C., Marshall B.A. & Murray T.J. (2011) Checklist of the Recent Mollusca Recorded from the New Zealand Exclusive Economic Zone

Facelinidae